Kelebek railway station is a railway station in the village of Durak, Adana in Turkey. The station consists of two side platforms on both sides of a single track.

TCDD Taşımacılık operates two daily intercity trains from Konya and Kayseri to Adana.

References

External links
TCDD Taşımacılık
Passenger trains
Kelebek station timetable

Railway stations in Adana Province